Finale: The Last Mantaray & More Show is a live DVD by Siouxsie, released in 2009. It is the last show of the Mantaray and More Tour, which took place on 29 September 2008 at London's KOKO.

The DVD includes music from her bands Siouxsie and the Banshees and the Creatures, and songs from her critically acclaimed Mantaray album.

It also features two cover versions only performed on the tour, the Doors's "Hello, I Love You" and Nancy Sinatra's "These Boots Are Made for Walkin'", plus a rendition of Basement Jaxx's "Cish Cash", which Siouxsie co-composed and sang in 2003.

Siouxsie began the concert telling the audience a Bette Davis line from the film All About Eve: "Fasten up your seatbelts, it's going to be a bumpy night".

Track listing
 "They Follow You" (from Siouxsie's Mantaray)
 "About to Happen" (from Siouxsie's Mantaray)
 "Hong Kong Garden" (from Siouxsie and the Banshees' The Best of)
 "Dear Prudence" (from Siouxsie and the Banshees' The Best of)
 "Right Now" (from the Creatures' A Bestiary of)
 "Sea of Tranquility" (from Siouxsie's Mantaray)
 "Christine" (from Siouxsie and the Banshees' Kaleidoscope)
 "Happy House" (from Siouxsie and the Banshees' Kaleidoscope)
 "One Mile Below" (from Siouxsie's Mantaray)
 "Into a Swan" (from Siouxsie's Mantaray)
 "Israel" (from Siouxsie and the Banshees' The Best of)
 "Arabian Knights" (from Siouxsie and the Banshees' Juju)
 "Here Comes That Day" (from Siouxsie's Mantaray)
 "Hello, I Love You"
 "If It Doesn't Kill You" (from Siouxsie's Mantaray)
 "Night Shift" (from Siouxsie and the Banshees' Juju)
 "Loveless" (from Siouxsie's Mantaray)
 "These Boots Are Made for Walkin'"
 "Spellbound" (from Siouxsie and the Banshees' Juju)
 "Nicotine Stain" (from Siouxsie and the Banshees' The Scream)
 "Cish Cash"
 "Swansway/Reprise"

Bonus
A 30-minute interview with Siouxsie

Band members 
Steve Evans - guitar
Robert Brian - drums 
Ted Benham - percussion 
Amanda Kramer - keyboards/synth 
Joe Short - bass

Crew members 
Sue Collier - tour manager
Neil Iceton - sound engineer
Gabriele Nicotra - sound engineer

References

Live video albums
2009 video albums
2009 live albums
Siouxsie Sioux albums